Stephen M. Bennett is an American businessman. From 2012 until March 20, 2014, he served as the president and chief executive officer of Symantec.

Biography

Early life
Bennett is the son of former University of Wisconsin Badgers football letterman Steve Bennett. He grew up in Wisconsin, attending Madison West High School before attending the University of Wisconsin, where he became a standout athlete in baseball. He was a two-time All-Big Ten selection and set school records for hits, doubles, and RBIs in a career. Bennett graduated from the UW-Madison in 1976 with a Bachelor’s in Business Administration.

Career
Bennett worked at General Electric for twenty-three years, where he held management roles in GE Capital e-Business, GE Capital Vendor Financial Services, GE Electrical Distribution and Control, GE Appliances, GE Medical Systems and GE Supply. He served as the CEO of Intuit from 2000 to December 2007. During his tenure at Intuit, annual revenue grew from less than $1 billion in 2000 to $2.7 billion in 2007.

Bennett joined the board of directors of Symantec in February 2010 and served as chairman from 2011 to 2013. He was named as Symantec’s chief executive officer in July 2012, replacing 19-year Symantec veteran Enrique Salem as CEO. He served until March 20, 2014, when he was fired for moving too slowly on innovation and new product development, according to The New York Times. He earned $36 million during his 20-month tenure.

He served on the board of directors of Sun Microsystems from May 2004 to December 2009.

References

American technology chief executives
General Electric people
Gen Digital people
Wisconsin School of Business alumni
Year of birth missing (living people)
Living people
Intuit people
American corporate directors
Madison West High School alumni